Ganyapadhura is a Gaupalika(Nepali: गाउपालिका ; gaupalika) in Dadeldhura District in the Sudurpashchim Province of far-western Nepal. Ganyapadhura has a population of 15093.The land area is 135.65 km2.

Notable people 

 Sher Bahadur Deuba, current Prime Minister of Nepal.

References

Rural municipalities in Dadeldhura District
Rural municipalities of Nepal established in 2017